Lake Pontchartrain Bridge may refer to:
Lake Pontchartrain Causeway
Norfolk Southern Lake Pontchartrain Bridge
Maestri Bridge on US 11
I-10 Twin Span Bridge